Thirty-nine vessels of the Royal Navy and its predecessors have borne the name Swallow, as has one dockyard craft, one naval vessel of the British East India Company, and at least two revenue cutters, all after the bird, the Swallow:

  was a ship launched in 1497, renamed Swallow when rebuilt in 1512.
  was a 53-gun ship launched in 1544, rebuilt in 1558 and 1580 and sold in 1603.
  was a discovery vessel listed in the Arctic in 1558 and captured by the Spanish in 1568.
  was an 8-gun pinnace built in 1573 and condemned in 1603.
  was a vessel listed in Newfoundland in 1583.
  was a 40-gun ship launched in 1634. She served in the Royalist Navy from 1648 and was sold in 1653.
  was a 6-gun ketch launched in 1657 and given to the Irish Packet Service in 1661.
  was a 40-gun ship launched in 1653 as Gainsborough. She was renamed HMS Swallow in 1660 and was wrecked in 1692.
  was a 6-gun ketch purchased 1661, sold 1674.
  was a 2-gun sloop launched in 1672 and lost in 1673.
  was a 6-gun sloop launched in 1699 and captured by a French privateer in 1703.
  was a 54-gun fourth rate launched in 1703, rebuilt in 1719 and broken up in 1728.
  was a 60-gun fourth rate launched in 1732. She was renamed HMS Princess Louisa in 1737 and was broken up in 1742.
She was renamed HMS Swallow that year, but was wrecked at the end of 1744.
  was a 14-gun  launched in 1745, used for the impress service from 1762 and sold in 1769.
  was a 14-gun  launched in 1769. She foundered in 1778.
  was a 14-gun brig-rigged sloop launched in 1779 and driven ashore in 1781.
  was a 16-gun brig-rigged sloop, previously a cutter purchased on the stocks and launched in 1781. She was sold in 1795. She became a West Indiaman and a hired armed vessel for the British government. She captured some prizes and was last listed in 1799.
  was an 18-gun brig-sloop launched in 1795 and sold in 1802. She then became a privateer, and a whaler.
  was an 18-gun  launched in 1805 and broken up in 1815.
  was a 10-gun brig-sloop, formerly the packet Marquis of Salisbury. She was purchased in 1824 and sold in 1836.
  was a wooden paddle packet, previously the General Post Office vessel Ferret. She was launched in 1831, transferred to the Royal Navy in 1837 and was broken up in 1848.
  was a  launched in 1854 and sold in 1866.
  was a  launched in 1868 and sold in 1882.
  was a  launched in 1885 and sold in 1904.
She was renamed  in 1942 and launched in 1943. 
  was a  patrol corvette launched in 1984. She was sold to the Irish Naval Service in 1988 and renamed LÉ Ciara.

One small vessel of the East India Company's Bombay Marine (its naval arm), also bore the name Swallow:
 Swallow of 1770 was a 14-gun ketch launched in 1770 at Bombay, and lost in 1776.

See also
 : at least two vessels named Swallow have served the Royal Navy as ship's tenders, one from 1793 to 1795, and a second from 1811 to 1825.
 
  - one of several vessels by that name

Notes, citations, and references
Notes

Citations

References
 
 
 
 

Royal Navy ship names